Agdistis tigrovaja is a moth of the family Pterophoridae. It is found in Tajikistan.

The forewings are grey. Adults have been recorded in July and August.

References

External links

Moths described in 2001
Endemic fauna of Tajikistan
Agdistinae